Battalion Park is a geoglyph site in southwest Calgary, Alberta, Canada. It is located on Signal Hill, overlooking the Tsuu T'ina Nation (formerly Sarcee Nation), as well as lands formerly known as Camp Sarcee and later Sarcee Training Area, a military reserve used by the Canadian Forces from before the First World War up until the 1990s. Its heritage value is associated with its dedication to the heroic efforts of Albertan soldiers during the First World War. The site contains four geoglyphs, numbered 137, 113, 151, and 51. The large, whitewashed stones, totalling 16,000 in all, form the centrepiece of the park. Arranged on the side of the hill, and visible from various parts of the city, they represent the battalions numbered 137th, 113th, 151st, and 51st.

Geography
The  park on Signal Hill overlooks the Tsuutʼina Nation.  It is situated to the north of the Elbow River, beside the Westhills shopping complex, on the city's western outskirts.

History

Early history
The then-Sarcee Indian Reserve leased a part of their land in the summer of 1914 to the Canadian Militia to enable them to establish a prospective training site for military personnel. It was then known as Sarcee Camp (as it overlooks what was then called the Sarcee Nation), and it was an exclusive area in Alberta to provide training to the soldiers who were to be assigned to fight during the First World War. The military reserve was used by the Canadian Forces from before the First World War up until the 1990s. In all, 45,000 men were trained at the military camp. With this strength, the camp was the largest military training establishment in Canada during the war time. The 30 various units, housed in tents, included trainees drawn from various parts of the province. From Calgary, it took a day's ride to approach the camp.

Army engineers mapped the area. Each unit established its identity within its prescribed area by using stones that were hauled in sacks by hand from the river by soldiers as part of their training programme, over a distance of  during off-duty hours. Several military units collaborated in collecting the stones to create the battalion numerals. They were gathered from the river and carried it to the site as part of the training exercies. Among those who did so were the four battalions of the Canadian Expeditionary Force (Members of the Calgary, Lethbridge, Central Alberta, and Edmonton battalions) who were trained in the area.

After their training was over, the battalions were assigned to war regions abroad to fight in the First World War. The 151st (Central Alberta) Battalion, raised in the Red Deer, Battle River, and South Edmonton districts, trained at the Sarcee Camp from December 22, 1915, until October 4, 1916; Lieutenant-Colonel J.W. Arnott commanded. The 137th (Calgary) Battalion, CEF, which was composed of the men of "Calgary's Own", were trained in the Sarcee Camp from December 1915 to August 1916; they were commanded by Lieutenant-Colonel George W. Morfitt. On August 21, 1916, they embarked to Europe to participate in the war. They were amalgamated with the 21st Reserve Battalion for service. Those men who survived the war met at the park, until the 1960s, to carry out weeding operations and also to repaint the stones of their battalion number which they had erected. The 113th Battalion (Lethbridge Highlanders), CEF, consisted of 883 men and officers who were trained at the Sarcee Camp from late May 1916 until September. The battalion used painted rocks to construct their battalion number on Signal Hill. The 51st Battalion (Edmonton), CEF, under the command of Colonel Harwood, was also at the Sarcee Army Camp, in 1915.

Later history
With the battalions gone, the numbers were almost forgotten, overgrown by shrubs and grass. The stones were almost obscured until a local historian found them; he found the stones prior to grading as part of a protection strategy for the hill which was subject to erosion, and to enable construction activity in the area. Getting the site its present historical status involved concerted efforts by the cadets of units, particularly of the 157th Battalion, stationed in Calgary; this effort stretched to several years of pursuing with the authorities. The stones were safely kept by Stewart Green Properties Ltd until they were restored. Development involved work on a gravel pit by Richmond Road, slope grading, rock replacement, and stairs construction. Battalion Park officially opened on 3 November 1991.

The 51st Battalion is perpetuated by an existing reserve unit, the Loyal Edmonton Regiment. The 137th Battalion is perpetuated by another reserve unit, the King's Own Calgary Regiment (RCAC). The 151st Battalion was perpetuated by the North Alberta Regiment, which disbanded in 1936, and the 113th Battalion of the Lethbridge Highlanders is perpetuated by the South Alberta Light Horse.

Features
The glyphs, which form the centre piece of the park, are large whitewashed stones (16,000 of them), arranged on the side of the hill and represent the battalions numbers 137, 113, 151, and 51. The numbers, serif-type numerals, were created using 16,000 stones. While the numerals 137, 151, and 51 are in a cluster, the glyph representing number "113" is further away in an undisturbed state as made in-situ initially from July 1, 1916, to August 31, 1916, but located within the park. Number "113" is at its original location, on a high ridge, while the others had to be shifted from their original location to the present site because of the need to develop the area for roads and other economic activities. The number is made up of white-painted stones. The park consists of a walkway up the hill along paved and mud paths with several interpretative displays of the numerals and a "lookout landing".

Commemoration
In a homage paid by 104 cadets who gathered at the Battalion Park Monument, a plaque was erected as dedication to their ancestors who were part of the action during 1915 and 1916 in the First World War. The names of the battalions are mentioned on the plaque. On this occasion they also painted the stones which mark the numbers of the battalions. The units involved in its assembly, mentioned on the plaque, are: 85 RCSCC Calgary, 604 Moose Squadron RCAC, 22 Undaunted RGSCC, 781 Calgary Squadron, RCAC 1292 LdSH (RC), RCACC 2554, PPCLI CC 1955, Service Battalion RCACC, Buffalo Squadron 538, RCAC 2509, Royal Cdn Signals, CC 2137 Calgary Highlanders, and CC 52 City of Calgary Squadron RCCA.

Members of The King's Own Calgary Regiment (RCAC), who perpetuate the 137th (Calgary) Battalion CEF, commemorate the sacrifices of their fallen comrades each Remembrance Day by sending a contingent to the memorial and conducting a ceremony of remembrance.

See also
Hillside letters
Military history of Canada
Fovant Badges

References

External links
 
 History of the Canadian Forces Museums 1919—2004

Parks in Calgary
Buildings and structures in Calgary
Museums in Calgary
Military and war museums in Canada
Geoglyphs
Hill figures in Canada